The 6th U-boat Flotilla (German 6. Unterseebootsflottille), also known as  Hundius Flotilla, was a front-line unit of Nazi Germany's Kriegsmarine before and during World War II.

Formed on 1 October 1938 in Kiel under the command of Korvettenkapitän Werner Hartmann, it was named in honour of Kapitänleutnant Paul Hundius, a U-boat commander during World War I, that died on 16 September 1918 after his U-boat  was sunk by depth charges from British steamer Young Crow. The flotilla was disbanded in December 1939.

The flotilla was re-formed as "6th U-boat Flotilla" in July 1941 under the command of Korvettenkapitän Georg-Wilhelm Schulz with her base in Danzig. During the first months it was a training flotilla, but when it moved to St. Nazaire in February 1942 it became a combat flotilla. It was disbanded in August 1944, when the last boats left the base for Norway.

Flotilla commanders

Assigned U-boats
At one point in their service history, each of the following boats served with 6th flotilla

References 

06
Military units and formations of the Kriegsmarine
Military units and formations established in 1938
Military units and formations established in 1941
Military units and formations disestablished in 1939
Military units and formations disestablished in 1944